Ubangi (also spelled Ubangui, Ubanghi, or Oubangui) may refer to:

Places
 Ubangi Province in the north of Zaire
 Ubangi River, tributary of the Congo River in the region of Central Africa
 Ubangi-Shari, a French colony which became the Central African Republic
 Apostolic Vicariate of Belgian Ubanghi, a former Catholic missionary (initially an Apostolic Prefecture)

Other uses
Ubangian languages, a family of Central African languages 
 An obsolescent term for African women with lip plates, see Lip plate#Ubangi misnomer
Ubangi (film), a 1931 William M. Pizor film

See also 
 Ubangi Stomp